The 2008–09 Oklahoma State Cowboys men's basketball team represented Oklahoma State University in the 2008–09 NCAA Division I men's basketball season. This was head coach Travis Ford's inaugural season at Oklahoma State. The Cowboys competed in the Big 12 Conference and played their home games at Gallagher-Iba Arena. They finished the season 23–12, 9–7 in Big 12 play. They lost in the semifinals of the 2009 Big 12 men's basketball tournament. They received an at–large bid to the 2009 NCAA Division I men's basketball tournament, earning an 8 seed in the East Region, where they advanced to the Second Round by defeating 9 seed Tennessee 77–75. The Cowboy's fell in the Second Round to 1 seed Pittsburgh.

Pre-season
In the Big 12 preseason polls, released October 7, Oklahoma State was selected to finish sixth in the Big 12 coaches poll.

Roster
Source

Schedule and results
Source 
All times are Central

|-
!colspan=9| Regular Season

|-
!colspan=10| 2009 Big 12 men's basketball tournament

|-
!colspan=9| 2009 NCAA Division I men's basketball tournament

References

Oklahoma State
Oklahoma State
Oklahoma State Cowboys basketball seasons
2008 in sports in Oklahoma
2009 in sports in Oklahoma